Albert Guðmundsson may refer to:
 Albert Guðmundsson (footballer, born 1923) (1923–1994), Icelandic football forward and politician
 Albert Guðmundsson (footballer, born 1958), Icelandic football midfielder
 Albert Guðmundsson (footballer, born 1997), Icelandic football winger